Bruno Renan Trombelli (born April 19, 1991) or simply Bruno Renan is a Brazilian defensive midfielder who currently plays for 3 de Febrero in the Primera División Paraguaya.

Career

Grêmio

Born in Maringá, Bruno Renan joined the Grêmio youth academy in 2005, aged 14. He was sold to Villarreal C.F. alongside Tiago Dutra for around £1.8 million, without playing a single match for the senior team. The club still owns 20% of his rights. He also attracted interest from Chelsea.

Villarreal

After featuring in pre-season friendlies with the first team, Renan moved to Villarreal B to play in the Segunda División. However, with the full three non-EU quota fulfilled, Renan moved back to Grêmio on a two-year loan deal.

Shakhtar Donetsk

On August 31, 2010 Bruno moved to Shakhtar Donetsk in a five-year deal. He made his debut for the club in 2-0 away victory over Poltava in the Ukrainian Cup, coming off after 59 minutes for Luiz Adriano. His league debut came in a 1-1 draw with Vorskla Poltava, as a 73rd minute replacement for Douglas Costa.

Return to Brazil
After spells at Pelotas, Maringá and América de Natal, Renan joined Paranaguá side Rio Branco for 2017.

3 de Febrero
The player joins the '3' of Ciudad del Este in December 2017.

Career statistics

International

Bruno Renan was an international for the Brazil under-18 national team.

Honours
Grêmio
Campeonato Brasileiro Sub-20: 2008

References

External links 
  Profile at Official Villarreal C.F. Website
  Video Interview with Bruno Renan

1991 births
Living people
Brazilian footballers
Brazilian expatriate footballers
Brazilian expatriate sportspeople in Spain
Expatriate footballers in Spain
Expatriate footballers in Ukraine
Brazilian expatriate sportspeople in Ukraine
Campeonato Brasileiro Série A players
Grêmio Foot-Ball Porto Alegrense players
Villarreal CF B players
FC Shakhtar Donetsk players
FC Zorya Luhansk players
Criciúma Esporte Clube players
Ukrainian Premier League players
Esporte Clube Pelotas players
América Futebol Clube (RN) players
Rio Branco Sport Club players
Association football midfielders